Eutelesia variegata is a moth of the subfamily Arctiinae. It is found in Brazil.

References

 Natural History Museum Lepidoptera generic names catalog

Lithosiini